Ryan Estep (born 1987) is an American wheelchair fencer from Monroe, Louisiana who won a silver medal in the U.S. Fencing National Wheelchair Championship and next year won gold at the same place. In 2012 he also got a silver medal for his participation in the Montreal Wheelchair World Cup.

References

Paralympic wheelchair fencers of the United States
1987 births
Living people
Sportspeople from Monroe, Louisiana
Wheelchair fencers at the 2012 Summer Paralympics
American male épée fencers
American male foil fencers